The following radio stations broadcast on AM frequency 1090 kHz: 1090 AM is a United States and Mexican clear-channel frequency. KAAY Little Rock, WBAL Baltimore and XEPRS-AM Rosarito-Tijuana share Class A status on 1090 AM.

In Argentina 
 Libertad in Rosario, Santa Fe

In Canada 
 CBON-12 in Mattawa, Ontario - 40 watts, transmitter located at

In Mexico 
Stations in bold are clear-channel stations.
 XEAU-AM in Monterrey, Nuevo León
 XEFC-AM in Mérida, Yucatan
 XEHR-AM in Puebla, Puebla
 XEPRS-AM in Rosarito, Baja California - 50 kW daytime, 50 kW nighttime, transmitter located at 
 XEWL-AM in Nuevo Laredo, Tamaulipas

In the United States 
Stations in bold are clear-channel stations.

In Uruguay 
 CX 28 Radio Imparcial in Montevideo

References

Lists of radio stations by frequency